The  is a network of urban expressways in Japan serving the greater Nagoya area. It is owned and managed by Nagoya Expressway Public Corporation.

Overview

The first section of the Nagoya Expressway network opened to traffic in 1979. As of 2008,  of the network has been completed.

The Ring Route at the center of Nagoya is one-way, flowing clockwise. Routes 1 through 6 extend radially from the Ring Route, with Route 2 bisecting the Ring Route. Route 4 is the only route still under construction. Routes 11 and 16 are extensions of Routes 1 and 6 respectively; a separate toll is required for these routes.

Nagoya Expressway faces competition from the expressways operated by Central Nippon Expressway Company in the greater Nagoya area. Discount policies on these expressways are much more significant than those on the Nagoya Expressway network, which leads to reduced revenue for the Nagoya Expressway and reduced efficiency of the entire road network in the region.

Tolls

Fares are denominated in yen. The first value in each field applies to passenger cars and light trucks (including 2-wheeled vehicles), while the second applies to large trucks and buses.

The following applies only when using Electronic Toll Collection (ETC).
*1 Special discounted fare for vehicles using only designated short sections of the expressway network.
*2 Special discounted fare for travel on Sundays and national holidays (all day), and between 22:00 and 0:00 every day (20:00 - 24:00 until July 31, 2008).
*3 Special discounted fare for travel between 0:00 and 6:00 every day (0:00 to 6:30 until July 31, 2008).

References

External links
 Nagoya Expressway Public Corporation